Šarūnas Šulskis (born 26 November 1972, in Kėdainiai) is a Lithuanian chess Grandmaster (1996).

Chess career
He won the Lithuanian Chess Championship on five occasions: in 1991, 1994, 1998 (shared with Vidmantas Mališauskas), 2007 and 2009,  played for Lithuania in the Chess Olympiads of 1994, 1996, 1998, 2002, 2004, 2008 and 2010 and in the European Team Chess Championships of 1997, 2005, 2007, 2009 and 2011.

In 2011 he won the Guernsey International Chess Festival. In 2019 he was 2nd in Riga Technical University Open.

Chess strength
According to Chessmetrics, at his peak in August 2003 Šulskis's play was equivalent to a rating of 2627, and he was ranked number 75 in the world. His best single performance was at Goodricke 13th op Calcutta, 2002, where he scored 8,5 of 11 possible points (77%) against 2555-rated opposition, for a performance rating of 2697.

In the January 2012 FIDE list, he has an Elo rating of 2595, making him Lithuania's number one.

Notable games
Sarunas Sulskis vs Johann Hjartarson, Groningen, FIDE WCH k.o NED 1997, French Defense: Winawer (C16), 1/2-1/2
Emory A Tate vs Sarunas Sulskis, Continental Open 2001, Gunderam Defense: General (C40), 0-1
Sarunas Sulskis vs Mark A Berkovich, 20th Cappelle la Grande 2004, Italian Game: Two Knights Defense (C55), 1/2-1/2
Sarunas Sulskis vs Thomas Michalczak, 6th EU Ch. 2005, Russian Game: Cochrane Gambit (C42), 1-0

References

External links

Chessmetrics Player Profile: Sarunas Sulskis

1972 births
Living people
Sportspeople from Kėdainiai
Chess grandmasters
Chess Olympiad competitors
Lithuanian chess players